Colorado Proposition 114 (also the Reintroduction and Management of Gray Wolves Proposition, and formerly Initiative #107) was a ballot measure that was approved in Colorado in the November 2020 elections. It was a proposal to reintroduce the gray wolf back into the state. The proposition was passed with a narrow margin, making Colorado the first US state to pass legislation to reintroduce wildlife.

Background and proposal
Gray wolves are native to North America, including Colorado and were once present across the state; however, overhunting of common prey (especially elk) and an increase in livestock numbers forced them into conflict with ranchers. Wolves were hunted, trapped and poisoned into local extinction by the 1940s.

The Colorado Parks and Wildlife Commission rejected a proposal to reintroduce the gray wolf in 2016, citing the potential impact on big game and livestock ranching in the state as well as the fact that the national gray wolf population elsewhere had already exceeded federal conservation goals. Resolutions by the Commission opposing reintroduction had also been passed in 1982 and 1989.

Proposition 114 was instigated through ballot initiative as Initiative #107. Rocky Mountain Wolf Action Fund claimed in December 2019 that they had gathered 211,000 signatures in support of Initiative #107. In January 2020 it was confirmed that the initiative had collected 139,333 valid signatures, above the 124,632 signatures needed to be included in the 2020 elections.

Proposition 114 directs the Colorado Parks and Wildlife Commission to:
Develop plans to reintroduce and manage gray wolves in designated areas in Colorado west of the Continental Divide by 31 December 2023.
Hold hearings across the state on scientific, economic and social considerations.
Periodically update the plan using public input.
Use state funds to help livestock owners adapt to prevent conflict with wolf populations, and to pay fair compensation for livestock losses to gray wolves.

Almost all the potential core wolf habitat is in the west of Colorado, in or to the west of the Southern Rocky Mountains, whereas the state's most populous areas are more to the east. The proposals were estimated to cost between $5 million and $6 million over six years.

Campaign

Support 
The Rocky Mountain Wolf Action Fund led the campaign in support of Proposition 114.

It was argued that wolves would "restore Colorado's natural balance", and that reintroduction was needed to counter the effects of the gray wolf's protections under the Endangered Species Act being removed in October 2020. Mike Phillips, a wolf biologist, said that having gray wolves in Colorado again would "serve as the archstone" in connecting wolf populations to the north and south.

Endorsements

Opposition 
Stop The Wolf PAC led the campaign against Proposition 114.

It was argued that the proposition would have negative effects on ranchers like past propositions, such as one in the 1990s which banned hunting by trapping, snare or poison. Some opponents of the proposition argued that wolves should naturally repopulate the state rather than state agencies interfering.

By October 2020, 39 of Colorado's 64 counties adopted resolutions opposing the measure.

Endorsements

Neutral

Results

Statewide

By county

Aftermath

In the 2021 regular session of the Colorado Legislature, HB21-1037 was introduced by Representative Matt Soper and Senators Bob Rankin and Ray Scott. The bill sought to limit the areas where the wolves are reintroduced into to those which voted for Proposition 114 and those which are not home to animals which are the prey of gray wolves and designated by Colorado Parks and Wildlife to be threatened or endangered. A non-partisan analysis from legislative staff commented that the bill "would appear to rule out any reintroduction". The bill failed to progress from the Colorado House Energy and Environment Committee in February 2021.

The first phase of public involvement in reintroduction efforts was undertaken from July to August 2021, including a schedule of over 40 meetings and focus groups.

See also

List of Colorado ballot measures

References

External links
Text of the Proposition

Proposition 114
2020 Colorado ballot measures
Wolves in the United States